Croatian Biographical Lexicon is a multi-volume biographical and bibliographical encyclopedia in Croatian, published by the Miroslav Krleža Institute of Lexicography. It contains biographies of prominent Croats, as well as foreigners who participated in Croatian public life and have left their mark on the history of Croatia.

The project was launched in the second half of the 1970s. Seven volumes have been published so far with a total of 10,218 articles (3,524 illustrations). The Editor-in-Chief of the first volume was Nikica Kolumbić, of the second volume Aleksandar Stipčević, and since 1990 the Chief Editor has been Trpimir Macan.

Many of the biographies in the Lexicon have been researched and published for the first time.

Volumes

References

External links
 Croatian Biographical Lexicon Online (in Croatian)

20th-century encyclopedias
Croatian online encyclopedias
1983 non-fiction books